Yosemitia fieldiella is a species of snout moth in the genus Yosemitia. It was described by Harrison Gray Dyar Jr. in 1913. It is found in the US states of California and Arizona.

References

Moths described in 1913
Phycitini